Timothy Lee Barnwell (born 1955) is an American author, commercial photographer, and fine art photographer based in Asheville, NC. His photojournalistic work has been published in dozens of publications including Time, Newsweek, Mother Jones, Billboard, LensWork, National Parks, American Craft, Outdoor Photographer, Blue Ridge Country, Our State, Smoky Mountain Living, Ceramics Monthly, and B & W magazine. An amateur astronomer, he is one of the founding members of the Astronomy Club of Asheville. Mr. Barnwell served as club president for many years and has had images published in Sky & Telescope and Astronomy magazines. LensWork, a photographic magazine, ran cover stories on two portfolios of his work; "Appalachian Home" with interview in Issue #76 / May–June 2008 and "Jewels of the Southern Coast" in Issue 126 / September–October 2016.

In 1981 he founded Appalachian Photographic Workshops and served as Director and photography instructor until it closed in 1988. As director he designed, coordinated, and taught year-round workshops with staff and visiting master photographers including Cole Weston, Ernst Hass, George Tice, Galen Rowell, Freeman Patterson, Jerry Uelsmann, Robert Farber, John Shaw, Sonja Bullaty, Angelo Lomeo, Ken Marcus, John Sexton, Nancy Brown, Art Wolfe, Steve Krongard, E. Alan McGee, Dean Conger, and Carson Graves. Since 1988 he has worked as a commercial and fine art photographer, taught photography classes, and produced eight books.

He has been principal or contributing photographer to dozens of books and is the author of eight of his own including, The Face of Appalachia: Portraits from the Mountain Farm (W.W. Norton/NY, 2003 and reprinted as new, 2nd edition by Numinous Editions, 2021); On Earth's Furrowed Brow: The Appalachian Farm in Photographs (W.W. Norton/NY, 2007); Hands in Harmony: Traditional Crafts and Music in Appalachia (W.W. Norton/NY, 2009); Blue Ridge Parkway Vistas: A Comprehensive Identification Guide to What You See From the Many Overlooks (Numinous Editions, 2014), Great Smoky Mountains Vistas: A Guide, with Mountain Peak Identifications, for What to See and Do In and Around the National Park (Numinous Editions, 2016), Faces & Places of Cashiers Valley (Cashiers Historical Society, 2019), Tide Runners: Shrimping and Fishing on the Carolinas and Georgia Coast (Numinous Editions, 2019), and Jewels of the Southern Coast: Architectural Gems of Charleston, Savannah and Beyond (Numinous Editions, 2022).

Bibliography
The Face of Appalachia: Portraits from the Mountain Farm (2003)
On Earth's Furrowed Brow: The Appalachian Farm in Photographs (2007)
Hands in Harmony: Portraits from the Mountain Farm (2009)
Blue Ridge Parkway Vistas: A Comprehensive Identification Guide To What You See from the Many Overlooks (2014)
Great Smoky Mountains Vistas: A Guide, with Mountain Peak Identifications, for What to See and Do In and Around the National Park (2016)
Faces & Places of Cashiers Valley (2019)
Tide Runners: Shrimping and Fishing on the Carolinas and Georgia Coast (2019)
Jewels of the Southern Coast: Architectural Gems of Charleston, Savannah and Beyond (2022)

Exhibitions
Barnwell's photography has been included in over 65 exhibits since 1977, including three one-man shows in New York City's SOHO Photo Gallery. His work is included in the permanent collections of numerous museums such as the Metropolitan Museum of Art, the Asheville Art Museum, the Newark Museum of Art, the Greenville (SC) County Museum of Art, New Orleans Museum of Art, Mint Museum (Charlotte NC), Booth Western Art Museum, and the High Museum. His fine artwork is represented by the Lumiere gallery in Atlanta, GA.

References

External links
 

American photojournalists
Fine art photographers
American portrait photographers
1955 births
Living people
Appalachian studies
University of North Carolina at Asheville alumni
20th-century American photographers
21st-century American photographers
21st-century American non-fiction writers